The Italian Confederation of Free Workers' Unions (CISAL) is a national trade union center in Italy. It was formed in 1957 and is affiliated with the European Confederation of Independent Trade Unions.

References

External links
 Official site in Italian

European Confederation of Independent Trade Unions
National trade union centers of Italy
Trade unions established in 1957